Charlestown is a locality in the South Burnett Region, Queensland, Australia.

Geography 
Most of Charlestown is within protected areas including Wondai State Forest, McEuen State Forest, Cherbourg National Park, and Cherbourg Conservation Park.

History 
Charlestown Provisional School opened circa 1894 and closed circa 1894.

References 

South Burnett Region
Localities in Queensland